Lake Park is a city in Dickinson County, Iowa, United States. The population was 1,167 at the time of the 2020 census. Trappers Bay State Park is located just west of the town.

History

Lake Park had its start in the year 1882 by the building of the Burlington, Cedar Rapids and Northern Railway through that territory. Lake Park was incorporated in 1892.

On January 1, 1931, the new State Theatre was officially opened. In 1942, a tornado swept through the area, destroying many farm buildings. A new water treatment plant was built in 1970. In September 1980, Lake Park gained its own ambulance. On July 2, 2002, voters in the Harris–Lake Park School District approved a $4 million bond issue for the construction of a new educational facility on Lake Park's south side. In addition to the development of a new community center, shared public/school library and athletic fields were planned in the city. In 2003 an open house was held to officially open the new community center.

Education
Lake Park is served by the Harris–Lake Park Community School District.

Geography

Climate

Demographics

2010 census
As of the census of 2010, there were 1,105 people, 486 households, and 307 families residing in the city. The racial makeup of the city was 98.6% White, 0.5% from other races, and 1.0% from two or more races. Hispanic or Latino of any race were 1.0% of the population.

There were 486 households, of which 24.3% had children under the age of 18 living with them, 53.9% were married couples living together, 6.6% had a female householder with no husband present, 2.7% had a male householder with no wife present, and 36.8% were non-families. 31.7% of all households were made up of individuals, and 14.6% had someone living alone who was 65 years of age or older. The average household size was 2.21 and the average family size was 2.78.

The median age in the city was 47.3 years. 21.4% of residents were under the age of 18; 4.7% were between the ages of 18 and 24; 21.2% were from 25 to 44; 27.5% were from 45 to 64; and 25.1% were 65 years of age or older. The gender makeup of the city was 49.1% male and 50.9% female.

2000 census
As of the census of 2000, there were 1,023 people, 442 households, and 300 families residing in the city. The racial makeup of the city was 99.32% White, 0.10% Asian, and 0.59% from two or more races. Hispanic or Latino of any race were 0.39% of the population.

There were 442 households, out of which 24.7% had children under the age of 18 living with them, 59.5% were married couples living together, 5.9% had a female householder with no husband present, and 32.1% were non-families. 29.4% of all households were made up of individuals, and 15.2% had someone living alone who was 65 years of age or older. The average household size was 2.21 and the average family size was 2.73.

In the city, the population was spread out, with 20.1% under the age of 18, 6.7% from 18 to 24, 22.8% from 25 to 44, 21.9% from 45 to 64, and 28.4% who were 65 years of age or older. The median age was 45 years. For every 100 females, there were 95.6 males. For every 100 females age 18 and over, there were 92.2 males.

The median income for a household in the city was $35,104, and the median income for a family was $44,931. Males had a median income of $29,327 versus $21,250 for females. The per capita income for the city was $18,094. About 2.4% of families and 5.8% of the population were below the poverty line, including 6.5% of those under age 18 and 8.6% of those age 65 or over.

References

External links
 Official city website
 Harris–Lake Park Community School District website

Cities in Iowa
Cities in Dickinson County, Iowa